Whiteoak High School is a public high school in Mowrystown, Ohio, USA, and the only high school in the Bright Local Schools district. The student-teacher ratio is 17:1. The school mascot is the Wildcat. The high school and junior high are in the same building.

Athletics
Whiteoak competes in the Southern Hills Athletic Conference and is a member of the Ohio High School Athletic Association. Whiteoak offers a variety of sports, such as cross country, golf, volleyball, basketball, bowling, cheerleading, baseball, softball, and track & field.

2018 Baseball team reached Final Four, 1st in state coaches poll, won gold ball
2013 Baseball team reached Sweet 16 ranked, 9th in state, won gold ball
2002 Boys Basketball team reached final four

Notable alumni
 Kip Young, Former MLB player Detroit Tigers, Class of 1972

References

External links
District website

High schools in Highland County, Ohio
Public high schools in Ohio
Public middle schools in Ohio